Acleris tungurahuae is a species of moth belonging to the family Tortricidae. It is found in Ecuador.

The wingspan is about 20 mm. The head is yellowish white. The ground colour is pale brownish with browner suffusions and brown remnants of markings. The dorsum is orange, although the tornal area is more brownish. The hindwing is whitish grey mixed with brown in the apical area. It is distinct from all other New World Acleris species, although rather comparable with Acleris emera and Acleris matthewsi.

Etymology
The name refers to the terra typica, the Province of Tungurahua.

References

tungurahuae
Moths described in 2009
Moths of South America
Taxa named by Józef Razowski